Bonus is an unincorporated community in Butler County, Pennsylvania.

History
A post office called Bonus was established in 1898, and remained in operation until 1901. The origin of the name "Bonus" is obscure.

References

Unincorporated communities in Butler County, Pennsylvania
Unincorporated communities in Pennsylvania